FLYGTA Inc., operating as FLYGTA Airlines, established in 2014, is a Canadian air operator serving southern Ontario and Quebec. FLYGTA is a jet charter company with official bases in Toronto, Niagara, Oshawa, Muskoka, and Montreal, and provides air tourism services in Toronto and Niagara Falls, air charter, cargo, and scheduled flights. , the airline served over eight destinations with scheduled flights from Billy Bishop Toronto City Airport to/from destinations such as Barrie/Simcoe, St. Catharines/Niagara, Kitchener/Waterloo, Wiarton/Bruce Peninsula and Muskoka. The flight between Toronto-Billy Bishop and St. Catharines/Niagara is the shortest link between the two cities (land transportation methods must travel many kilometres around Lake Ontario) and is advertised as the shortest commercial flight in North America at 10 minutes according to the company and 15 minutes according to Global News.

The airline offers charters internationally mainly from Southern Ontario.

Scheduled destinations
 Barrie (Lake Simcoe Regional Airport)
 Bracebridge (Muskoka Airport)
 Kitchener/Waterloo (Region of Waterloo International Airport)
 St. Catharines/Niagara Falls (St. Catharines/Niagara District Airport)
 Toronto (Billy Bishop Toronto City Airport) (Hub)
 Wiarton/Bruce Peninsula (Wiarton Airport)
 Kingston (Norman Rogers Airport)

Fleet
FlyGTA Airlines the following light aircraft registered with Transport Canada:

The Transport Canada list also includes a Piper PA-34-200T Seneca II and a  Piper PA-28 Cherokee both with cancelled certificates. However, the Piper PA-28 Cherokee is listed at the FLYGTA site as a PA-28-161 Warrior II and still in operation.

References

External links
 

Regional airlines of Ontario